Kim Sands (born October 11, 1956) is an American former professional tennis player. She reached 44th in the WTA rankings in April 1984 and became the first African-American woman to receive a scholarship to the University of Miami where she earned a Bachelor of Education degree.

References

External links 
 
 

1956 births
African-American female tennis players
Living people
University of Miami School of Education alumni
21st-century African-American people
21st-century African-American women
20th-century African-American sportspeople
20th-century African-American women
20th-century African-American people
American female tennis players